Margaretta Ruth D'Arcy (born 14 June 1934, London) is an Irish actress, writer, playwright, and activist. 

D'Arcy has been a member of the Irish association of artists, known as Aosdána, since its inauguration and is known for addressing Irish nationalism, civil liberties, and women's rights in her work. 

In 2014, she was imprisoned after she refused to sign a bond saying that she wouldn't trespass on non-public parts of Shannon Airport. Her arrest was a consequence of trespassing on airport property during protests over  United States military stopovers at Shannon Airport.

Family and theatrical life
She was born in London to a Russian Jewish mother and an Irish Catholic father. D'Arcy worked in small theatres in Dublin from the age of fifteen and later became an actress. 

She was married in 1957 to English playwright and author John Arden, and they frequently collaborated. They settled in Galway and established the Galway Theatre Workshop in 1976. The couple had five sons, one of whom predeceased his mother. 

The couple wrote a number of stage pieces and improvisational works for amateur and student players, including The Happy Haven (1960) and The Workhouse Donkey. She has written and produced many plays, including The Non-Stop Connolly Show.

D'Arcy has also written a number of books, including Tell Them Everything, Awkward Corners (with John Arden), and Galway's Pirate Women: A Global Trawl.

Activism
As an activist, in 1961, D'Arcy joined the anti-nuclear Committee of 100, led by Bertrand Russell. In 1981 her peace-activism resulted in her incarceration in Armagh Jail, after defacing a wall at the Ulster Museum. Her book Tell Them Everything tells the story of her time during the Armagh and H-Block dirty protests and was one of the earliest accounts about the Armagh women, their Republicanism and imprisonment.

D'Arcy also directed Yellow Gate Women, a film about the attempts by women of Greenham Common Women's Peace Camp to outwit the British and United States Military at RAF Greenham Common with bolt cutters and legal challenges. Challenging censorship since 1987, she ran a women's kitchen pirate-radio from her home in Galway.

In 2011, D'Arcy refused to stand for a minute's silence to honor a PSNI officer Ronan Kerr, killed by dissident republicans, at an Aosdana meeting. Her actions were deliberate, she told media afterwards, which attracted fierce criticism of her perceived support for armed republican groups in Northern Ireland.

Along with Niall Farrell, she was arrested in October 2012 for scaling the perimeter fence of Shannon Airport, in protest at the use of the airport as a stopover for US military flights.

Affiliations
 Aosdána (member since its inauguration)
 Member of the World Association of Community Radio Broadcasters (AMARC)
 Executive member of AMARC's Women's International Network (WIN)

Works

Books
Her books include;

Plays
Her plays include;
 The Pinprick of History;
 Vandaleur's Folly;
 Women's Voices from W. of Ireland;
 Prison-voice of Countess Markievicz;
 A Suburban Suicide (a radio play, BBC3, 1995);
 Lajwaad (The Good People, play by Abdel Kader Alloula, adapted by M. D'Arcy for readings in London, 1995);
 Dublin (Irish Writers' Centre, 1996).

Plays devised as group productions include;
 Muggins is a Martyr;
 The Vietnam War-game;
 200 Years of Labour;
 The Mongrel Fox;
 No Room at the Inn;
 Mary's Name;
 Seán O'Scrúdu;
 Silence.

Plays written in collaboration with John Arden include;
 The Business of Good Government;
 The Happy Haven;
 Ars Longa Vita Brevis;
 The Royal Pardon;
 The Hero Rises Up;
 The Ballygombeen Bequest;
 The Non-Stop Connolly Show;
 ‘’The Island of the Mighty, A Trilogy’’ 1972 
 Keep the People Moving (BBC Radio);
 Portrait of a Rebel (RTÉ Television);
 The Manchester Enthusiasts (BBC 1984 and RTÉ 1984, under the title The Ralahine Experiment);
 Whose is the Kingdom? (9-part radio play, BBC 1987).

Films
Films as a director and those produced by Women in Media & Entertainment;
 Yellow Gate Women, 2007, shown at the 'Galway Film Fleadh' and Independent International Video & Film Festival (New York) [2008].
 Shell Hell, co-directed by Finn Arden, 2005, shown at Galway Arts Festival, the 'Stranger than Fiction Festival' at the IFC (Dublin) and the Human Rights Documentary Festival (Glasgow).
 Big Plane, Small Axe, the mis-trials of Mary Kelly, 2005, awarded 2nd Prize for Best Feature Documentary at Galway Film Fleadh, and also shown at Cork Film Festival, Portobello Film Festival, Human Rights Documentary Festival (Glasgow), and the Irish Film Festival (San Francisco).
 Circus Exposé, 1987 (60 minutes), shown at the Celtic Film Festival (Inverness) and Foyle Festival (Derry).

See also
 List of peace activists

References

Further reading

External links
 
 Biography at Margaretta D’Arcy official website (archived)
 Profile, Indymedia.ie
 

1934 births
Living people
Irish writers
Aosdána members
Irish anti-war activists
Irish dramatists and playwrights
Irish feminists
Irish Jews
Irish people of Russian-Jewish descent
Irish prisoners and detainees
Irish women's rights activists
Pacifist feminists
Prisoners and detainees of Northern Ireland
Prisoners and detainees of the Republic of Ireland
Irish women activists
Date of birth missing (living people)